Mauro Poggia (born 25 April 1959 in Moutier) is a Swiss-Italian politician.  He is a member of the Geneva Citizens' Movement (MCG) and has been a member of the Council of State of Geneva since 2013. Previously, he served in the National Council from the October 2011 election until 2013.

Biography 
Formerly a member of the Christian Democratic People's Party (CVP), Poggia left to join the MCG in 2009.  He was elected to the Grand Council of Geneva at the 2009 election.  He was elected as the MCG's sole member of the National Council at the 2011 election, representing Geneva.

He ran for the Senate of Italy in the 2008 election for the Union of Christian and Centre Democrats, seeking to represent Italians abroad.

He is a convert to Islam, the religion of his wife.

References

External links 
 Profile at parlament.ch
 Profile at the Canton of Geneva website

Members of the National Council (Switzerland)
Canton of Geneva politicians
Swiss-Italian people
1959 births
Living people

Swiss Muslims